The 2007–08 Dijon FCO season was the club's 10th season in existence and the club's fourth consecutive season in the second division of French football. In addition to the domestic league, Dijon participated in this season's edition of the Coupe de France and Coupe de la Ligue. The season covered the period from 1 July 2007 to 30 June 2008.

Pre-season and friendlies

Competitions

Overview

Ligue 2

League table

Results summary

Results by round

Matches

Coupe de France

Coupe de la Ligue

Statistics

Goalscorers

Source:

References

External links

Dijon FCO seasons
Dijon FCO